Juan Carlos Ferrero was the defending champion, but chose to compete in Umag.
Janko Tipsarević won the title against Juan Mónaco after defeating him 6–4, 5–7, 6–3 in the final.

Seeds
The top four seeds receive a bye into the second round.

Draw

Finals

Top half

Bottom half

Qualifying

Seeds
The top two seeds receive a bye into the second round.

Qualifiers

Lucky loser
  Eduardo Schwank

Draw

First qualifier

Second qualifier

Third qualifier

Fourth qualifier

References

External links
 Main draw
 Qualifying draw

Stuttgart Open Singles
Singles 2012